The 1994 Marseille Open was an ATP tennis tournament played on indoor carpet and held at the Palais des Sports de Marseille in Marseille, France, from 31 January through 6 February 1994. It was the second edition of the tournament and it was part of the ATP World Series. Fourth-seeded Marc Rosset won the singles title, successfully defending his title from 1993.

Finals

Singles

 Marc Rosset defeated  Arnaud Boetsch 7–6(8–6), 7–6(7–4) 
 It was Rosset's first singles title of the year and the 8th of his career.

Doubles

 Jan Siemerink /  Daniel Vacek defeated  Martin Damm /  Yevgeny Kafelnikov 6–7, 6–4, 6–1
 It was Siemerink's 1st title of the year and the 4th of his career. It was Vacek's 1st title of the year and the 5th of his career.

References

External links
 Official website 
 ATP tournament profile
 ITF tournament edition details